Radžis Aleksandrovičius, also known by his stage name Radži (born February 14, 1987) is a Lithuanian pop singer of Roma descent.

In 2008 he was nominated for "the biggest evil in Lithuanian music" at an awards ceremony highlighting the "worst" musicians in Lithuania.

Discography 
Radži has recorded 4 studio albums:
Ką daryt? (2007)
Visko būna (2007)
Pagyvensim pamatysim (2009)
Mano didelės storos čigoniškos vestuvės (2012)

References 

Lithuanian Romani people
Lithuanian pop singers
People from Panevėžys
1987 births
Living people
Romani singers